Diane D'Aquila (born October 23, 1952) is an American-Canadian actress. She has appeared in both television and film roles, but is best known for her stage appearances at the Stratford Festival.

Early life 
Born in Cedar Rapids, Iowa, D'Aquila was raised in Minneapolis. She spent much of her adult life and career in Canada and holds dual citizenship.

Career 
D'Aquila originated the role of Elizabeth I of England in Timothy Findley's play, Elizabeth Rex. She won both an ACTRA Award and a Gemini Award in 2005 for her performance in the play's television adaptation.

In 2009, she played Mary Mercer in Soulpepper's revival of David French's Of the Fields, Lately. She appeared on television and films including such appearances in Alfred Hitchcock Presents, Street Legal, Used People, The Ray Bradbury Theater, Hangin' In, Jane's House, The Long Island Incident, 72 Hours: True Crime, Milk and Honey and Slings and Arrows.

She has done voice-overs in animation including Little Bear as Grandmother Bear, Franklin as Miss Lynx, Bob and Margaret, Bad Dog, Ultraforce, The Busy World of Richard Scarry, Medabots, Roboroach, Rescue Heroes, Rolie Polie Olie, Freaky Stories, Ned's Newt, Angela Anaconda, Monster Force, Flash Gordon, George Shrinks, Timothy Goes to School, Blaster's Universe, Flying Rhino Junior High, The Adventures of Sam & Max: Freelance Police, Pippi Longstocking, The Dumb Bunnies, Highlander: The Animated Series, World of Quest, The Seventh Portal, Chilly Beach, Wilbur, The Berenstain Bears, Tales from the Cryptkeeper, The Neverending Story, Corduroy, The Dumb Bunnies, Pandalian, Busytown Mysteries, Kaput and Zosky, Jane and the Dragon, The Avengers: United They Stand, Silver Surfer and Cyberchase.

In 2017, D'Aquila portrayed the title role in King Lear at Toronto's Shakespeare in High Park, one of relatively few women ever to have performed the traditionally male role.

Personal life
D'Aquila was married to Canadian actor C. David Johnson from 1987 to 1992.

Filmography

Film

Television

References

External links
 

1953 births
Canadian television actresses
Canadian film actresses
Canadian voice actresses
Canadian stage actresses
American television actresses
American film actresses
American voice actresses
American stage actresses
American expatriate actresses in Canada
Canadian Screen Award winners
Actresses from Iowa
Actors from Cedar Rapids, Iowa
Living people
Date of birth missing (living people)
American emigrants to Canada
Canadian Shakespearean actresses